Pseudochromis tonozukai the Spot-stripe dottyback, is a species of ray-finned fish from the Eastern Indian Ocean around Indonesia, which is a member of the family Pseudochromidae.

References

tonozukai
Taxa named by Anthony C. Gill
Taxa named by Gerald R. Allen
Fish described in 2004